Rhapsody was one of United Airlines' monthly in-flight magazines, along with Hemispheres. It was directed toward luxury consumers, being available in United's lounges and first- and business-class cabins. The magazine was published by Ink and headquartered in Brooklyn, New York.

Rhapsody began publishing in November 2013 and was a self-proclaimed "luxury lifestyle and literary magazine." As of 2016, its readers' average net worth was $2,775,000 and household income was $380,700. Typical issues of the magazine contained profiles of celebrities (the main cover feature); coverage of the facets of a luxury lifestyle, such as fine dining, fashion, and hotels; and travel essays and other features, often written by notable writers such as Joyce Carol Oates, Anthony Doerr, Rick Moody, Amy Bloom, and Emma Straub. Monthly readership was about 2 million.

United ceased publication of Rhapsody in June 2018, with the last issue bearing a Summer 2018 date. The airline stated that it planned to incorporate the most popular elements of Rhapsody into its regular inflight magazine Hemispheres.

Awards
 Society of Publication Designers Awards, 2014: Silver Award for Photo Story, "In the Name of the Father"
 Content Marketing Awards, 2014: Gold Award for Best Design - New Publication and Bronze Award for Best New Publication
 Content Council Pearl Awards, 2015: Gold Award for Best Use of Photography
 Eddie and Ozzie Awards, 2016: Best Feature Design - Custom (more than six issues), Best Use of Illustration - Custom, and Best Series of Articles - Custom

References

External links
Ink Website
United Magazines Website

Monthly magazines published in the United States
Magazines established in 2013
Magazines disestablished in 2018
Lifestyle magazines published in the United States
Inflight magazines
Magazines published in New York City
Tourism magazines
United Airlines
Defunct magazines published in the United States